Platt Technical High School, or Platt Tech, is a technical high school located in Milford, Connecticut, United States. It is part of the Connecticut Technical High School System. Platt Tech receives students from many nearby towns.

Technologies
In addition to a complete academic program leading to a high school diploma, students attending Platt Tech receive training in a trade or technology. The available trades are:

 Automotive Collision Repair and Furnishing
 Automotive Technology
 Carpentry
 Culinary Arts
 Electrical
 Hairdressing and Cosmetology
 Heating, Ventilation, and Air Conditioning (HVAC)
 Information Technology
 Mechatronics
 Plumbing and Heating
 Precision Machining Technology (MT)
 Sustainable Architecture

References

External links
 

Buildings and structures in Milford, Connecticut
Schools in New Haven County, Connecticut
Public high schools in Connecticut